The Gender Equality and Family Development Select Committee (Malay: Jawatankuasa Pilihan Khas Kesaksamaan Gender dan Pembangunan Keluarga; ; Tamil: மலேசிய பாலின சமத்துவம் மற்றும் குடும்ப மேம்பாட்டு சிறப்பு தேர்வுக் குழு) is one of many select committees of the Malaysian House of Representatives. It is among six new bipartisan parliamentary select committees announced by Speaker of the House of Representatives, Mohamad Ariff Md Yusof, on 4 December 2018 in an effort to improve the institutional system. It was previously known as the Human Rights and Gender Equality Select Committee before the Human Rights and Constitutional Affairs Select Committee was set up on 17 October 2019.

Membership

14th Parliament 
As of December 2019, the committee's current members are as follows:

Former members of the committee are as follows:

Chair of the Gender Equality and Family Development Select Committee

See also 
Parliamentary Committees of Malaysia

References 

Parliament of Malaysia
Committees of the Parliament of Malaysia
Committees of the Dewan Rakyat